The Military Medical Academy (MMA) of Sofia is a large complex for medical treatment, as well as education, located in Sofia, Bulgaria. It has several branches and smaller clinics in other cities in the country.

It was established in 1891 as a military hospital and was transformed into a Senior Military Medical Institute (Висш военномедицински институт, ВВМИ) in 1960. The current structure dates from 1989, when the SMMI was unified with the main government hospital, the Navy hospital in Varna, and the Aero-medical research institute in Sofia. Doctors and specialists from the MMA are employed in army units.

Buildings and structures in Sofia
Military medical installations
Hospitals established in 1891
Military academies of Bulgaria
Universities and colleges in Sofia
Military academies